Leptosiphon rattanii (syn. Linanthus rattanii) is a rare species of flowering plant in the phlox family known by the common name Rattan's linanthus.

It is endemic to California, where it is known only from inner sections of the North Coast Ranges.

It is a small, thin annual herb producing a hairy, glandular stem up to 20 centimeters tall. The leaves are divided into tiny threadlike lobes. The inflorescence is generally made up of a single flower with a very thin, hairy, reddish tube over a centimeter long tipped with a flat white corolla with lobes a few millimeters in length.

External links
Calflora Database: Leptosiphon rattanii (Rattan's leptosiphon)
Jepson Manual eFlora (TJM2) treatment of Leptosiphon rattanii
UC CalPhotos gallery: Leptosiphon rattanii

rattanii
Endemic flora of California
Natural history of the California chaparral and woodlands
Natural history of the California Coast Ranges
Flora without expected TNC conservation status